The Commentry Shales is a geologic formation in France. It preserves fossils dating back to the Carboniferous period.

See also

 List of fossiliferous stratigraphic units in France

References
 

Carboniferous System of Europe
Shale formations
Carboniferous France
Geologic formations of France